Charly Antolini Meets Dick Morrissey is the second album recorded by Swiss drummer Charly Antolini and UK tenor sax player Dick Morrissey. The tracks are jazz and  standards repertoire and were recorded live at Pizza Express' Pizza on the Park, London on 5 December 1990.

Track listing 

"Secret Love" (Sammy Fain, Paul Francis Webster)
"Too Close for Comfort" (Jerry Bock, George David Weiss, Larry Holofcener)
"It Never Entered My Mind" (Richard Rodgers, Lorenz Hart)
"There Will Never Be Another You" (Harry Warren, Mack Gordon)
"You Stepped Out of a Dream" (Nacio Herb Brown, Gus Kahn)
"Just Squeeze Me (But Please Don't Tease Me)" (Duke Ellington, Lee Gaines)
"Darn That Dream" (Jimmy Van Heusen, Eddie DeLange)
"C-Jam Blues" (Duke Ellington)

Personnel

Charly Antolini - drums
Dick Morrissey - tenor saxophone
Brian Lemon - piano
Len Skeat - bass

References

Dick Morrissey albums
Collaborative albums
1990 live albums